Oochya! is the twelfth studio album by Welsh rock band Stereophonics, released on 4 March 2022 on Ignition Records. It is scheduled to be supported by a 2022 arena tour.

Background
Oochya! originally began life when the band were planning a 25th anniversary compilation. Frontman Kelly Jones said, "I began rooting through hard drives to see what to put on it. As I did that, I was finding songs we'd never released. Three or four songs on Oochya! are built on those, and it led me to writing a bunch of new songs too." Jones also described the album as "90 percent" uptempo.

Release and promotion

Singles
On 6 September 2021 the band released the first single taken from the album, "Hanging on Your Hinges". The song premiered on The Chris Evans Breakfast Show on Virgin Radio UK. An official lyric video was also uploaded to YouTube. "Do Ya Feel My Love?" was released as the second single in November 2021. "Forever" was released as the third single from the album on 25th January 2022, followed by an official video a week later.

Critical reception

Oochya! received mixed to positive reviews from music critics, with a number of them praising several standout tracks but noting that the fifteen-song tracklist resulted in thematic exhaustion and cliché. Dave Simpson, writing for The Guardian, said that the band was "past their best nowadays" but the album was "a decent effort after a quarter of a century" and said that the album "offers an occasionally uneven mix of their trusty hit formula". Harrison Smith of Gigwise wrote that "Stereophonics have tended to serve up middle-of-the-road ballads in recent times and found themselves in the realms of predictability. Oochya!, whilst dishing up much of the same, is a much more robust and energised project than the previous few albums". Graeme Marsh wrote for musicOMH that the album was "better than expected" given its mix of old and new material and that the quality of its singles varied more than a typical Stereophonics album but concluded that "Oochya! is undoubtedly one of Stereophonics’ better albums in recent times even if, at 15 tracks, it’s a little too long".

Commercial performance
On 11 March 2022 Oochya! became Stereophonics' eighth number-one album on the UK Albums Chart, outselling their closest competition by 2:1. Oochya! sold just over 24,000 copies in its first week, including just under 4,000 copies on vinyl. The album spent five weeks on the chart. The album is also the band's second consecutive chart-topper after 2019's Kind.

Track listing
All tracks written by Kelly Jones.

Charts

Release history

References

2022 albums
Stereophonics albums
Albums produced by George Drakoulias